Ronald John Allen (16 December 1930 – 18 June 1991) was an English actor. He is most well known for playing David Hunter in the long-running ITV soap opera Crossroads, a role he played from 1969 to 1985.

Biography 
Allen was born in Reading, Berkshire. He studied at Leighton Park School in Reading and trained at the Royal Academy of Dramatic Art (RADA) in London, where he won the John Gielgud Scholarship. He worked in repertory theatre and had a season at the Old Vic in London. Allen also appeared in several films, including A Night to Remember (1958) about the sinking of the Titanic, the espionage film A Circle of Deception (1960), the British horror films The Projected Man (1966) and The Fiend (1972), the war film Hell Boats (1970), and the black comedy Eat the Rich (1987).

After roles in the BBC soaps Compact (1963–64) and United! (1966–67) came his best remembered role, in the long-running Crossroads (1969–85). Allen played David Hunter, who was a shareholder of the Crossroads Motel with Meg Mortimer, Tish Hope and Bernard Booth. He also twice appeared as a guest star in the science fiction programme Doctor Who, in the stories The Dominators (1968) and The Ambassadors of Death (1970).

Allen also frequently appeared as a guest in The Comic Strip Presents. In the first episode, Five Go Mad in Dorset (1982), which spoofed Enid Blyton's The Famous Five stories, he makes a surprise appearance as Uncle Quentin; deliberately sending up his staid image, he most memorably told The Famous Five, "Your Aunt Fanny is an unrelenting nymphomaniac – and I am a screaming homosexual". Allen reprised the role in the sequel Five Go Mad on Mescalin (1983), and also appeared in South Atlantic Raiders Part 2 (1990), The Strike (1988) and Oxford (1990), in addition to the feature film The Supergrass (1985). There was much comic mileage to be gained from Allen sending up his conservative image. In a 1987 interview, he said that he was approached by a very intimidating-looking punk who shook his hand and said, "I thought you were really cool in The Supergrass". Then, as he was about to walk away, he turned back and said, almost apologetically, "I loved you in Crossroads too!"

Other roles included television's The Adventures of Robin Hood (1957), Danger Man (1960, 1961),  The Avengers (1964), and Bergerac (1990).

Allen's performance as David Hunter was also the inspiration for "Mr Clifford" in Victoria Wood's spoof soap Acorn Antiques in her 1980s comedy sketch series Victoria Wood: As Seen on TV. Played by Duncan Preston, he mimicked Allen's appearance, mannerisms and particularly his "absurdly plummy" manner of speech.

Personal life
For many years, Allen had a relationship with Brian Hankins, who also appeared in Crossroads. They lived together for many years, until Hankins died in 1978.

Allen was also very close friends with his co-star and on-screen wife, Sue Lloyd. The two became a couple, and made their relationship public when the British media started to intrude into their private lives. When Allen learned that he had terminal cancer, he and Lloyd married. He died three months later, at the age of 60. Sue Lloyd died of cancer in 2011.

Filmography

Film

Television

References
Citations

Bibliography

External links 
 
 

1930 births
1991 deaths
Alumni of RADA
Deaths from cancer in England
Deaths from esophageal cancer
English male film actors
English male soap opera actors
English male stage actors
People educated at Leighton Park School
Actors from Reading, Berkshire
20th-century English male actors
English LGBT actors